This is a list of ambassadors of the United States to Finland.

Until 1917 Finland had been a subject of Russia as the Grand Duchy of Finland. As a result of the Bolshevist October Revolution in Russia, Finland declared its independence on December 6, 1917. On December 22 (January 4, 1918 N. S.), the highest Soviet executive body approved a decree recognizing Finland’s independence.

The United States recognized Finland as an independent state on May 7, 1919. A U.S. legation was established in Helsinki and the first envoy, Alexander R. Magruder, presented his credentials as Chargé d'Affaires to the government of Finland on March 19, 1920. United States–Finland relations have been continuous since that time except for a brief period in 1944–45 when the U.S. severed relations during World War II.

The U.S. Embassy in Finland is located in Helsinki in the Kaivopuisto neighborhood.

Ambassadors

Notes

See also
Finland–United States relations
Foreign relations of Finland
Ambassadors of the United States

References
United States Department of State: Background notes on Finland

External links
 United States Department of State: Chiefs of Mission for Finland
 United States Department of State: Finland
 United States Embassy in Helsinki

Finland
 
United States